John K. Smith (died 1845) was an American pharmacist and businessman, who was the founder of SmithKline as in GlaxoSmithKline

Smith trained as a druggist, and joined his brother-in-law, John Gilbert, in 1830 to open a dispensing chemist at 296 North Second Street in Philadelphia. Together they sold drugs, paints, varnish, chemicals and window glass.

When John K. Smith decided to retire he handed the business on to his son, George K. Smith, who expanded it into a large international business.

John K. Smith died in 1845.

References

1845 deaths
Businesspeople in the pharmaceutical industry
Year of birth missing